Edenderry is a small village and townland in County Tyrone, Northern Ireland. In the 2001 Census it had a population of 84. It is within the Fermanagh and Omagh District Council area and lies on the north bank of the Camowen River. The townland is traversed by the B158 road.

References 

Villages in County Tyrone